Cuthbert  Haydock (1684-1763), one of a long line of priests from the prominent Catholic recusant Haydock family, helped to keep his faith alive during the long penal period in England by serving mass in secret for those who remained faithful to the Catholic Church.

Early years
Cuthbert Haydock was one of eight children.  His eldest brother, William, inherited the Haydock family manor, Cottam Hall Lancashire.  Cuthbert and another brother, Gilbert, became priests.  A third brother, Hugh, began studying for the priesthood, but withdrew before completion of his studies. The more violent persecution of Catholics, including the execution of priests, has ceased by Cuthbert's time.  However, priests could still not be trained in England, so Cuthbert went across the Channel to France to attend the English College, Douai (contemporary English spelling, Douay) where he was ordained in 1714, and then sent back to England.

The Missions in England
Although the Penal Laws were moderating by this time, there were still no formal Catholic parishes in England.  The remaining faithful were served by "missions" where services might be held in a variety of facilities depending on the local situation.  The newly ordained Father Haydock's first assignment was a mission established at home of his sister Mary:  Lane Ends House at Mawdesley Chorley Lancashire, where there were hiding places for priests and a secret chapel in the attic.

Legend Surrounding Lane Ends House

Lane Ends House was also known as Skull House.  This is due to its possession of a skull, said to be that of one of the Haydock ancestors, either William Haydock (1483?-1537), a Cistercian monk who was executed in 1536 for his part in the Pilgrimage of Grace, or Blessed George Haydock (1556-1584), executed for being a priest in violation of Queen Elizabeth's Penal law.  This skull had been kept at the Haydock family manor, Cottam Hall.   However, Cuthbert's brother William sold the estate, and sometime afterward, the skull was transferred to Lane Ends House, where it was venerated as a relic.

Later Assignments

Father Haydock went on to serve missions in nearby Euxton Lancashire, the home of a cousin, William Anderton; at Hodsock Park Nottinghamshire, the home of another of his sisters; then at Worksop Manor Nottinghamshire, where he became chaplain to the 9th Duke of Norfolk. While there, his zeal caught the attention of a local Protestant minister, Rev. John Cook, who denounced him as a "zealot," who "spread his poison openly whether in taverns, or at market crosses or on crowded thoroughfares."  His other activities included assisting his brother Gilbert in handling business arrangements for the exiled nuns at St. Monica's Convent in Louvain and in recruiting students for his alma mater at Douay.  He died at age 78, leaving an extensive collection of books and manuscripts, some of which are now at Stonyhurst College.

See also
Roman Catholicism in Great Britain (The Eighteenth Century & The Catholic Revival in the Nineteenth Century)

References

Alger, Brendan, "Cuthbert Haydock and Lane-End House, Mawdesley," North West Catholic History, Vol. III, 1971.
Camm, Dom Bede 
Tyburn Conferences Oxford, Douay, Tyburn, Benziger Bros., NY, 1906
Forgotten Shrines, an Account of Some Old Catholic Halls and Families in England and of Relics and Memorials of the English Martyrs, Macdonald & Evers, London, 1910.
Fields, Kenneth, Lancashire Magic & Mystery, Secrets of the Red Rose County, Sigma Press, 2004.
Gillow, Joseph, The Haydock Papers:  A Glimpse into English Catholic Life under the Shade of Persecution and in the Dawn of Freedom, Burns & Oates, London and New York, 1888.
Shannon, William D., Your Sorrow Shall Be Turned Into Joy, Published for the Author, 2014.
Squiers, Granville, Secret Hiding Places – The Origins, Histories and Descriptions of English Secret Hiding Places Used by Priests, Cavaliers, Jacobites & Smugglers, Stanley Paul & Co., Ltd., London, 1933.
 Williams, Richard G., Mannock Strickland 1683-1744; Agent to English Convents in Flanders.  Letters and Accounts from Exile, The Boydell Press, 2016.

External links
  Lane Ends House today.

1684 births
1763 deaths
English College, Douai alumni
History of Catholicism in the United Kingdom
18th-century English Roman Catholic priests